Kulad may refer to:
Kulad, Iran, a village
villages in Estonia